Barigo Miankheel is a hill station, 30 km away from Dassu in Kohistan District, Pakistan of Khyber Pakhtunkhwa, Pakistan. It is famous for beautiful lakes, among them Kandawo lake located to northwest of Baiso at about three hours of trekking.

Kohistan District, Pakistan